Thomas M. Siebel (born November 20, 1952) is an American billionaire businessman, technologist, and author. He was the founder of enterprise software company Siebel Systems and is the founder, chairman, and CEO of C3.ai, an artificial intelligence software platform and applications company.

He is the chairman of First Virtual Group, a diversified holding company with interests in investment management, commercial real estate, agribusiness, and philanthropy.

Early life and education
Siebel was born in Chicago, one of seven children of Arthur Francis Siebel, a Harvard-educated lawyer, and Ruth A. (née Schmid) Siebel. His family was Lutheran. Siebel is a graduate of the University of Illinois at Urbana-Champaign, where he received a B.A. in history, an M.B.A., an M.S. in computer science, and an honorary doctorate of engineering.

Business career
Between 1984 and 1990, Siebel was an executive at Oracle Corporation, where he held a number of management positions. Siebel served as chief executive officer of Gain Technology, a multimedia software company that merged with Sybase in December 1992.  Siebel was the founder, chairman, and chief executive officer of Siebel Systems, which was acquired by Oracle in January, 2006. Siebel is the chairman of First Virtual Group, a diversified holding company.

Siebel Systems
Siebel Systems was a software company primarily engaged in the design, development, marketing, and support of customer relationship management (CRM) applications. As an executive at Oracle, Siebel proposed the idea of creating enterprise software applications tailored for marketing, sales, and customer service functions. Oracle management declined his proposal. Siebel left Oracle to found Siebel Systems in 1993 to pursue that opportunity. In 1999, Siebel Systems became the fastest-growing technology company in the United States. Siebel Systems grew to over 8,000 employees in 32 countries, more than 4,500 corporate customers, and annual revenue greater than $2 billion before merging with Oracle in January 2006.

C3.ai
C3 AI is a software company Siebel founded in 2009 that specializes in large-scale enterprise artificial intelligence. C3 AI offers an enterprise AI software product that uses machine learning and neural networks to solve complex analytical problems in commerce, industry, and government. Organizations use this software to improve their operations, reduce costs, and improve readiness. The US Air Force, Missile Defense Agency, and Department of Defense Innovation Unit are among its customers. As of 2022, the company had 42 "turnkey enterprise AI applications" for customers in various industries and includes a "no-code" AI product that helps solve business problems.

C3.ai was included in the 2019 “CNBC Disruptor 50” list, with a valuation of $2.1 billion. Through C3.ai, Siebel created a collaboration to use AI to help address COVID-19.

The company's board, led by Siebel and Patricia House, includes notable members such as former U.S. Secretary of State Condoleeza Rice and former vice chairman of the Joint Chiefs of Staff General John Hyten, Retired.

Digital transformation
Siebel's fourth book, Digital Transformation, became a Wall Street Journal bestseller in July 2019. In the book Siebel discusses how the confluence of four modern information technology vectors—elastic cloud computing, big data, artificial intelligence, and the internet of things—is impacting business, government, and society. He characterizes the 21st century as a period of corporate mass extinction. He states that since 2000, 52 percent of Fortune 500 companies have fallen off the list, and he discusses how new companies like Amazon, Uber, Tesla, Airbnb, and others have emerged and grown during this time.

Siebel claims that in order to survive and thrive in the 21st century, organizations must undergo digital transformation by harnessing the four information technologies discussed in the book. The book provides advice to organizations in the form of a 10-point CEO action plan.

Management philosophy
Siebel is a proponent of building a “self-learning corporate culture” that motivates employees to continue their education on the job. C3.ai offers cash awards of $1,000 to $1,500 to employees for each course they complete from a curated Coursera curriculum. In 2019, Siebel initiated a program at C3.ai that pays 100 percent of the costs for employees to complete an online master's degree of computer science (MCS) program from the University of Illinois at Urbana-Champaign. Employees who complete the MCS degree receive a salary increase of 15 percent, a cash bonus of $25‚000, and additional stock options.

Honors and awards
In 2013, the American Academy of Arts and Sciences elected Tom Siebel as a member.

Siebel serves on the Board of Advisors of the Stanford University College of Engineering, the University of Illinois College of Engineering, and the University of California, Berkeley College of Engineering. He is a Director of the Hoover Institution at Stanford University, and is the Chairman of the Board for the American Agora Foundation. He was a member of the Trustees of Princeton University from 2008 to 2011. He is the Founder and Chairman of the Montana Meth Project  and the Siebel Scholars Foundation, and Chairman of the Siebel Foundation. He was ranked #5 and #3 of the world's top 25 philanthropists by Barron's Magazine in 2009 and 2010, respectively. In 2007 and 2008, he was named one of The 50 Most Generous Philanthropists by BusinessWeek.

Siebel received the David Packard Award for his achievements as a technology entrepreneur and his contributions to national security from the Business Executives for National Security in 2002 and was named one of the Top 25 Managers in the World by BusinessWeek in 2000 and 2001.

Call Center Magazine inducted Siebel to its Hall of Fame in 2000 in recognition for contributions to the business and technology of customer service. CRM Magazine inducted him into its inaugural CRM Hall of Fame in 2003 in recognition of his vision, strong leadership, and enduring commitment to innovation. He has also been named:
 
Entrepreneur of the Year, EY, 2018
Goldman Sachs Most Intriguing Entrepreneur, 2018
Glassdoor Top CEO, 2018
Entrepreneur of the Year, EY, 2017
Most Admired CEO Lifetime Achievement Award - San Francisco Business Times, 2016
The Chancellor's Citation, University of California, Berkeley, 2014
One of the World's Top 25 Eco-Innovators - FORTUNE magazine, 2014
Woodrow Wilson Award for Corporate Citizenship – The Woodrow Wilson International Center for Scholars of the Smithsonian Institution, 2010
Engineering at Illinois Hall of Fame - University of Illinois at Urbana-Champaign, 2010
Lewis & Clark Pioneers in Industry Award - University of Montana, 2006
Master Entrepreneur of the Year – Ernst & Young, 2003<ref name=ernstyoung>[http://www.allbusiness.com/company-activities-management/operations/5730353-1.html Northern California Ernst & Young Recognizes Thomas M. Siebel as Master Entrepreneur of the Year], Business Wire</ref>
David Packard Award – Business Executives for National Security, 2002
CEO of the Year – Industry Week, 2002
University of Illinois Presidential Award and Medallion, 2001
Top 10 CEOs - Investor's Business Daily, 2000
One of Top 25 Managers in Global Business – BusinessWeek, 1999 to 2001

Philanthropy
The Siebel Foundation (founded 1996) is active in support of the homeless and underprivileged, educational and research programs, methamphetamine abuse prevention, and alternative energy solutions. The Siebel Foundation created the Siebel Scholars Foundation, the Siebel Energy Institute, and the Dearborn Scholars Fund in Montana. In 2005, Siebel founded the Montana Meth Project.The Anti Drug Lord, Good Magazine, June 2008 The Office of National Drug Control Policy awarded the Meth Project a White House commendation as the most influential prevention campaign in 2006, and Tom Siebel accepted the award on the program's behalf. He was also recognized for his work on the program with the 2006 Director's Community Leadership Award from the Federal Bureau of Investigation.Catalytic Philanthropy – Stanford Social Innovation Review, Fall 2009Tom Siebel: The Energy Free Home Challenge, Forbes, June 2009

In 2001, Siebel donated $32 million to his alma mater, the Department of Computer Science at the University of Illinois at Urbana-Champaign, to build the Siebel Center for Computer Science, opened in spring 2004.  In 2006, Siebel donated $4 million to the University of Illinois at Urbana-Champaign to establish two endowed full professorships, the Thomas M. Siebel Chair in the History of Science and the Thomas M. Siebel Chair in Computer Science.  Siebel pledged an additional $100 million gift to the University of Illinois at Urbana-Champaign in 2007. In 2015, the Siebel Foundation launched the Siebel Energy Institute to research the data management of energy infrastructure monitoring data. In 2016, Siebel donated $25 million to build the Siebel Center for Design at the University of Illinois, a 60,000-square-foot multidisciplinary hub designed by architects Bohlin Cywinski Jackson and was completed in 2020.

Political involvement
From 2009 to 2014, Siebel made a total of $335,300 in political contributions. Approximately 90% of this was for independents and 10% was for Republican Party candidates.

In 2013, C3 Energy hosted former Senator Max Baucus from Montana, and Siebel and Baucus discussed the ways in which information technology addresses the utility industry's big data challenge.

In April 2014, Congresswoman Jackie Speier from California met with C3 Energy executives, including Siebel, to discuss how the latest developments in IT are being applied to the power grid.

In February 2022, Siebel donated $90,000 to the Canada convoy protest in Ottawa, that also blocked border crossings between Canada and the U.S. to protest COVID-19 vaccine mandates and restrictions.

Personal life
He is married to Stacey Siebel. They have four children and live in Woodside, California, US.

A part-time Montana resident, Siebel owns and operates the Dearborn Ranch in Wolf Creek, Montana, a working cattle ranch. Siebel's time in Montana has extended over a period of 35 years.

Siebel currently has the highest personal CO2 emissions from private jet use of any American as of 2022.

Elephant incident
On the morning of August 1, 2009, he and a guide were in Tanzania, observing a group of elephants from 200 yards away, when an elephant charged Siebel's guide and then turned on Siebel, breaking several ribs, goring him in the left leg, and crushing the right.A Golfer Never Forgets, by Jerry Tarde, Golf Digest, July 2010 They radioed for help, but it was three hours before he received any medical treatment. He was flown to the Aga Khan University Hospital in Nairobi, where they cleaned his wounds and stabilized his leg. He was then flown back to the United States on a 20-hour flight with only 10 hours of morphine and 15 hours of fluids. He had lost half of his fluids and was put in the intensive care unit. He was moved to Stanford Hospital where, over the next six months, they performed 11 surgeries, fixed his ribs and shoulder, and saved his left leg.

In September 2010, a year after the attack, Siebel had undergone 16 surgeries and an Ilizarov apparatus external fixator to mend, lengthen, and reshape the tibia of his right leg. After 19 reconstructive surgeries over two and a half years, Siebel has now made a full recovery. In 2013, National Geographic included Siebel's account in its TV series Dead or Alive: Trampled on Safari.

Books and articlesDigital Transformation (2019) 
“Digital Transformation: The Post-Industrial Utility” (Aspenia Magazine, June 2018)
“Why digital transformation is now on the CEO’s shoulders” (McKinsey Quarterly, December 2017)
“The Internet of Energy” (Electric Perspectives, March/April 2015)
“Big Data and the Smart Grid: Is Hadoop the Answer?” (Stanford Energy Journal, October 21, 2014)Taking Care of eBusiness (2001) Cyber Rules (with Pat House) (1999) Virtual Selling'' (with Michael Malone) (1996)

References

External links
 First Virtual Group
 The Thomas and Stacey Siebel Foundation
C3.ai (formerly C3 Energy, C3 IoT)

American billionaires
American computer businesspeople
American Lutherans
American philanthropists
Businesspeople in software
American technology chief executives
Living people
Gies College of Business alumni
University of Illinois Urbana-Champaign alumni
1952 births
People from Woodside, California